Melt van Schoor (born 8 December 1967) is a South Africa-born Namibian cricketer. He is a right-handed batsman and a wicketkeeper. He played in the ICC Trophy between 1994 and 2001, and has played List A cricket since then. He also played five One Day Internationals in the World Cup in 2003. Van Schoor generally occupies the lower order, but performs well in this position.

Melt van Schoor is the brother of fellow cricketer Ian van Schoor.

In February 2020, he was named in Namibia's squad for the Over-50s Cricket World Cup in South Africa. However, the tournament was cancelled during the third round of matches due to the coronavirus pandemic.

References

External links

1967 births
Living people
Cricketers from Cape Town
Cricketers at the 2003 Cricket World Cup
Namibian cricketers
Namibia One Day International cricketers
Namibian sportsmen
Namibian cricket coaches
Wicket-keepers